In number theory and algebraic geometry, a rational point of an algebraic variety is a point whose coordinates belong to a given field. If the field is not mentioned, the field of rational numbers is generally understood. If the field is the field of real numbers, a rational point is more commonly called a real point. 

Understanding rational points is a central goal of number theory and Diophantine geometry.

Definition

Sometimes, when the field  is understood, or when  is the field  of rational numbers, one says "rational point" instead of "-rational point".

For example, the rational points of the unit circle of equation

are the pairs of rational numbers

where  is a Pythagorean triple.

The concept also makes sense in more general settings.

More generally, let  be a scheme over a field . This means that a morphism of schemes  is given. This agrees with the previous definitions when  is an affine or projective variety (viewed as a scheme over ).

Example: Let  be the conic curve  in the affine plane  over the real numbers  Then the set of real points  is empty, because the square of any real number is nonnegative.

The scheme  is determined up to isomorphism by the functor ; this is the philosophy of identifying a scheme with its functor of points.

The theory of Diophantine equations traditionally meant the study of integral points, meaning solutions of polynomial equations in the integers  rather than the rationals  For homogeneous polynomial equations such as  the two problems are essentially equivalent, since every rational point can be scaled to become an integral point.

Rational points on curves
Much of number theory can be viewed as the study of rational points of algebraic varieties, a convenient setting being smooth projective varieties. For smooth projective curves, the behavior of rational points depends strongly on the genus of the curve.

Genus 0

Genus 1
It is harder to determine whether a curve of genus 1 has a rational point. The Hasse principle fails in this case: for example, by Ernst Selmer, the cubic curve  in  has a point over all completions of  but no rational point. The failure of the Hasse principle for curves of genus 1 is measured by the Tate–Shafarevich group.

The Mordell–Weil theorem says that for an elliptic curve (or, more generally, an abelian variety)  over a number field , the abelian group  is finitely generated. Computer algebra programs can determine the Mordell–Weil group  in many examples, but it is not known whether there is an algorithm that always succeeds in computing this group. That would follow from the conjecture that the Tate–Shafarevich group is finite, or from the related Birch–Swinnerton-Dyer conjecture.

Genus at least 2
Faltings's theorem (formerly the Mordell conjecture) says that for any curve  of genus at least 2 over a number field , the set  is finite.

Some of the great achievements of number theory amount to determining the rational points on particular curves. The curve  (like any smooth curve of degree  in ) has genus 

It is not known whether there is an algorithm to find all the rational points on an arbitrary curve of genus at least 2 over a number field. There is an algorithm that works in some cases. Its termination in general would follow from the conjectures that the Tate–Shafarevich group of an abelian variety over a number field is finite and that the Brauer–Manin obstruction is the only obstruction to the Hasse principle, in the case of curves.

Higher dimensions

Varieties with few rational points
In dimension 1, this is exactly Faltings's theorem, since a curve is of general type if and only if it has genus at least 2. Lang also made finer conjectures relating finiteness of rational points to Kobayashi hyperbolicity.

For example, the Bombieri–Lang conjecture predicts that a smooth hypersurface of degree  in projective space  over a number field does not have Zariski dense rational points if . Not much is known about that case. The strongest known result on the Bombieri–Lang conjecture is Faltings's theorem on subvarieties of abelian varieties (generalizing the case of curves). (So if  contains no translated abelian subvarieties of positive dimension, then  is finite.)

Varieties with many rational points
Frédéric Campana conjectured that a variety is potentially dense if and only if it has no rational fibration over a positive-dimensional orbifold of general type. Campana's conjecture would also imply that a K3 surface  (such as a smooth quartic surface in ) over a number field has potentially dense rational points. That is known only in special cases, for example if  has an elliptic fibration.

One may ask when a variety has a rational point without extending the base field. For example, the Hasse–Minkowski theorem says that the Hasse principle holds for quadric hypersurfaces over a number field (the case ).

For hypersurfaces of smaller dimension (in terms of their degree), things can be more complicated. Jean-Louis Colliot-Thélène has conjectured that the Brauer–Manin obstruction is the only obstruction to the Hasse principle for cubic surfaces. More generally, that should hold for every rationally connected variety over a number field.

In some cases, it is known that  has "many" rational points whenever it has one. For example, extending work of Beniamino Segre and Yuri Manin, János Kollár showed: for a cubic hypersurface  of dimension at least 2 over a perfect field  with  not a cone,  is unirational over  if it has a -rational point. The Manin conjecture is a more precise statement that would describe the asymptotics of the number of rational points of bounded height on a Fano variety.

Counting points over finite fields

A variety  over a finite field  has only finitely many -rational points. For example, if  is a smooth projective curve of genus  over a field  of order  (a prime power), then

There are also significant results about when a projective variety over a finite field  has at least one -rational point. For smooth , this also follows from Hélène Esnault's theorem that every smooth projective rationally chain connected variety, for example every Fano variety, over a finite field  has a -rational point.

See also

 Arithmetic dynamics
 Birational geometry
 Functor represented by a scheme

Notes

References

External links
 

Diophantine geometry